Tabbaliyu Neenade Magane or Godhuli is a 1977 Indian drama film co-directed by Girish Karnad and B. V. Karanth, starring Kulbhushan Kharbanda, Om Puri and Naseeruddin Shah. It is based on the Kannada novel Tabali Neenade Magane, written by S. L. Byrappa as an allegory for nation-building and the clash of modernity with tradition in rural India. It portrays the story of a modern agriculturist who returns from US after studying agriculture and brings his American wife to the village.  The film was made in Hindi and Kannada versions: Godhuli .

Godhuli was included the 1984 International Film Festival of India (IFFI). At the 25th National Film Awards, S. P. Ramanathan won the Best Audiography. It won the Filmfare Award for Best Screenplay at the 27th Filmfare Awards for Girish Karnad and B.V. Karanth.

Cast
 Naseeruddin Shah as Venkataramana Shastri
 Lakshmi Krishnamurthy as Thaiyavva
 Manu as Kalingegowda
 Paula Lindsay as Lydia
Kannada cast
 T. S. Nagabharana
 Om Puri as the servant
 Sunder Raj
 Sudheer
Hindi cast
 Kulbhushan Kharbanda as Nandan Gowda

Plot
The movie explores the cultural problems experienced by an American woman, newly married to an Indian, adjusting to Indian norms and customs. It depicts a modern man who studies agriculture in the United States, returns to India with an American wife with their different views. The theme is one of alienation from fellow human beings.

References

Bibliography
 
 
 
 
 

1970s Kannada-language films
1977 films
Kannada literature
1970s Hindi-language films
Best Kannada Feature Film National Film Award winners
Indian multilingual films
Films that won the Best Audiography National Film Award
1977 multilingual films
Films directed by Girish Karnad